Presidency College may refer to:

 Presidency College, Bangalore, a private college in India
 Presidency College, Chennai, India
 Presidency College, Kolkata, India

See also
 Presidency University (disambiguation)